Serena-Lynn Geldof (born March 2, 1997) is a Belgian basketball player for BC Namur-Capitale and the Belgian national team. She played college basketball for the Miami Hurricanes in Miami, Florida. After two seasons, Geldof returned to Belgium and went professional.

She participated at the EuroBasket Women 2017.

References

1997 births
Living people
Belgian expatriate basketball people in the United States
Belgian women's basketball players
Centers (basketball)
Miami Hurricanes women's basketball players
Sportspeople from Ostend